Aedes apicoargenteus is an African mosquito species, first described as Stegomyia apicoargentea from specimens collected in Ashanti, Ghana.

Bionomics

Adults have been collected along bush-paths in bush habitat near Obuasi and Kumasi, Ghana.  Distribution includes Angola, Benin, Burkina Faso, Cameroon, Central African Republic, Congo, Cote d'Ivoire, Democratic Republic of the Congo (Zaire), Gabon, Ghana, Kenya, Liberia, Nigeria, Senegal, Sierra Leone, Sudan and South Sudan, Tanganyika, Togo, and Uganda.

Medical importance

Adult Aedes apicoargenteus are human-biters, and vectors of Zika virus, the causative agent of Zika fever.

References

apicoargenteus
Insects described in 1910